Belli Park is a rural locality in the Sunshine Coast Region, Queensland, Australia.

Geography 

Kenilworth Road is the main road (and also a popular tourist drive) that connects Belli Park to its nearest townships, being Eumundi (to the east) and Kenilworth (to the west).

Belli Park has a community hall and a Rural Fire Brigade. The Belli Creek and the Belli Park area is a part of the Mary River catchment.

History 
The locality takes its name from Belli Creek, which derives its name from the Kabi language word belai or billah referring to the she oak tree (Casuarina glauca)

Belli Park Provisional School opened on 20 January 1908. On 1 January 1909 it became Belli Park State School. It closed on 31 December 1963.

The median age of the Belli Park population was 44 years, 7 years above the national median of 37. 74.6% of people living in Belli Park were born in Australia. The other top responses for country of birth were England 7.4%, New Zealand 2.6%, Scotland 1%, Germany 0.9%, Netherlands 0.9%. 90.7% of people spoke only English at home; the next most common languages were 1% German, 0.9% Gilbertese, 0.5% Polish, 0.5% Dutch.

References

External links
https://web.archive.org/web/20131111091523/http://www.sunshinecoast.qld.gov.au/addfiles/documents/community_planning/belli_park_snapshot.pdf
Belli Park Weather
Community Profile: Belli Park – Cooloolabin – Gheerulla – Coolabine
http://www.visitsunshinecoast.com.au/regions/the-hinterland/travel-information#1
Old Photos from Belli Park.

Suburbs of the Sunshine Coast Region
Localities in Queensland